These are the results of the men's C-2 slalom competition in canoeing at the 1996 Summer Olympics. The C-2 (canoe single) event is raced by two-man canoes through a whitewater course.  The venue for the 1996 Olympic competition was at the Toccoa/Ocoee River near the Georgia-Tennessee state line.

Medalists

Results
The 15 teams each took two runs through the whitewater slalom course on July 28. The best time of the two runs counted for the event.

References

1996 Summer Olympics official report Volume 3. p. 163. 
1996 men's slalom C-2 results
Wallechinsky, David and Jaime Loucky (2008). "Canoeing: Men's Canadian Slalom Pairs". In The Complete Book of the Olympics: 2008 Edition. London: Aurum Press Limited. p. 488.

Men's Slalom C-2
Men's events at the 1996 Summer Olympics